Warnken is a surname. Notable people with the surname include:

Harry Warnken (1884–1951), American gymnast
Heinz Warnken (1912–1943), German footballer
Cristián Warnken (born 1961), Chilean literature professor and media personality
Byron Warnken (1946–2022), American Professor of Law University of Baltimore School of Law